Haematopota crassicornis, the black-horned cleg is a species in the horse-fly family, Tabanidae.

Description
Haematopota crassicornis typically measures  in length. It is generally dark in colour, and like most species of Haematopota it has three narrow, lighter longitudinal stripes mainly on its pro- and mesonotum. The abdomen is greyish. The antennae are black.

Distribution
Haematopota crassicornis occurs widely throughout most of Europe, having been reported from the Iberian Peninsula in the west, to Russia in the east, Italy in the South, and much of Scandinavia and the British Isles in the north.

Habitat
The preferred habitat of Haematopota crassicornis is moist woodland, with pond margins where they may lay their eggs.

Ecology
The males of Haematopota crassicornis visit flowers for nectar. The females suck blood from various mammals, particularly from large species such as cattle and humans. The larvae live in moist soil, largely preying on small invertebrates such as other insects. The adults are most active from May to August but they still may be seen through September.

References

External links

Haematopota crassicornis on E Photo Zine
Images

Tabanidae
Insects described in 1848
Taxa named by Johan August Wahlberg
Diptera of Europe